Pablo Martín Perafán (born 31 January 1987) is an Argentine professional footballer who plays as a goalkeeper for Guillermo Brown, on loan from Quilmes.

Career
Perafán began in Gimnasia y Esgrima's youth. His senior career started in 2008, featuring in Primera C Metropolitana for Villa San Carlos and El Porvenir. In 2009, Perafán moved to Paraguayan football after agreeing to join 2 de Mayo. Nine appearances followed in the 2009 Paraguayan Primera División season. Perafán returned to Argentina with Defensa y Justicia in 2009, subsequently remaining for three campaigns whilst making eighty-one appearances; netting his first senior goal in the process on 9 June 2012 against Huracán. In July 2012, Argentine Primera División side Unión Santa Fe signed Perafán.

Having been selected sixteen times in 2012–13, Perafán joined his sixth career club on 28 July 2013 after completing a move to Vélez Sarsfield. He failed to feature competitively in twelve months, though was an unused substitute five times in all competitions. Perafán began playing for Douglas Haig in the 2014 Primera B Nacional campaign. Seventy-seven appearances followed for the club between 2014 and 2017, though the goalkeeper did spend the 2015 season with fellow second tier side Juventud Unida Universitario. A move to Villa Dálmine came in August 2017, prior to Perafán signing for Mitre a year later.

Career statistics
.

References

External links

1987 births
Living people
Sportspeople from Buenos Aires Province
Argentine footballers
Association football goalkeepers
Argentine expatriate footballers
Expatriate footballers in Paraguay
Argentine expatriate sportspeople in Paraguay
Expatriate footballers in Chile
Argentine expatriate sportspeople in Chile
Primera C Metropolitana players
Paraguayan Primera División players
Primera Nacional players
Chilean Primera División players
Argentine Primera División players
Club Atlético Villa San Carlos footballers
El Porvenir footballers
2 de Mayo footballers
Defensa y Justicia footballers
Unión de Santa Fe footballers
Club Atlético Vélez Sarsfield footballers
Club Atlético Douglas Haig players
Juventud Unida Universitario players
Villa Dálmine footballers
Club Atlético Mitre footballers
Club Agropecuario Argentino players
Curicó Unido footballers
Quilmes Atlético Club footballers